Nova Scotia killings may refer to:

2020 Nova Scotia attacks, a spree killing event
Sydney River McDonald's murders, a robbery and triple homicide in 1992
Dartmouth Massacre, a 1751 attack
Grand-Pré Massacre, a 1747 attack